K-1 World Grand Prix, known in Japan as , is a video game based on the K-1 martial arts organization in Hong Kong and the K-1 World Grand Prix, developed and published by Konami for PlayStation 2 in 2002-2003. It is the thirteenth game in the K-1 Fighting series.

Reception

The game received "average" reviews according to the review aggregation website Metacritic. In Japan, Famitsu gave it a score of 30 out of 40.

References

2002 video games
K-1
Konami games
Martial arts video games
PlayStation 2 games
PlayStation 2-only games
Video game sequels
Video games developed in Japan